Carmine Gautieri (born 20 July 1970) is an Italian professional football coach and a former player. He is currently the head coach of Serie C club Sangiuliano City.

Playing career
Gautieri amassed a total 227 games with 26 goals in Serie A, the top level of Italian football. An offensive midfielder, he also played for Roma in the late 1990s under the tenure of manager Zdeněk Zeman.

Coaching career
Gautieri started his coaching career in the minor leagues, with Potenza and Olbia. His breakthrough came with third division minnows Virtus Lanciano, which he joined in 2011–12 and immediately led to success in the Lega Pro Prima Divisione promotion playoffs. After being confirmed as Virtus Lanciano head coach for the club's historical first Serie B appearance, he managed his side to league safety despite having been widely predicted as one of the likeliest sides for relegation.

Gautieri left Virtus Lanciano at the end of the 2012–13 season, and was appointed new Bari head coach thereafter. This role was however quite short-lived, as he tended his resignation on 3 August 2013, citing personal reasons. In November 2013 he was appointed new head coach of another Serie B club, Varese, in place of Stefano Sottili only to be dismissed himself later in March 2014 due to poor results.

In July 2014 he was named new head coach of newly relegated Serie B club Livorno. He was removed from his managerial duties on 3 January 2015 and replacing with youth coach Ezio Gelain, with Livorno in sixth place.

He then served as head coach of Serie B club Latina from March to June 2016, succeeding in keeping the Lazio-based club in the second division. On 22 January 2017, Gautieri went back into management as new head coach of another relegation-battling Serie B club, Ternana. After Gautieri lost 6 matches in a row out of 7, he was fired only one and a half months later.

On 14 October 2019, he joined Serie C club Triestina. He was sacked on 2 December 2020 due to a negative start in the 2020–21 Serie C season.

On 17 February 2022, he signed for Avellino on a deal until the end of the season. After not being confirmed as head coach of Avellino, on 23 January 2023 he was appointed at the helm of Serie C club Sangiuliano City.

References

External links

1970 births
Living people
Association football wingers
Italian footballers
Italian football managers
Empoli F.C. players
S.S. Turris Calcio players
A.C. Cesena players
S.S.C. Bari players
A.C. Perugia Calcio players
A.S. Roma players
Piacenza Calcio 1919 players
Atalanta B.C. players
S.S.C. Napoli players
Delfino Pescara 1936 players
A.S.D. Sorrento players
Potenza S.C. managers
S.S.C. Bari managers
U.S. Livorno 1915 managers
Ternana Calcio managers
U.S. Triestina Calcio 1918 managers
U.S. Avellino 1912 managers
Serie A players
Serie B players
Serie C players
Serie B managers
Serie C managers